is a Shinto shrine in the city of Obama in Fukui Prefecture, Japan. It is the ichinomiya of former Wakasa Province. It is also sometimes referred to as the

Enshrined kami
The kami enshrined at Wakasahiko Jinja are:
 Upper shrine: , the son of Ninigi and grandfather of Emperor Jimmu
 Lower shrine: , the daughter of the sea deity, Watatsumi.

Overview
The shrine is located at the foot of Mt. Tadagadake in the southeast from the center of Obama city. Wakasahiko Shrine was formerly worshipped by seafarers, as Hoori is said to have obtained magical beads with which he could manipulate the tides while residing at Ryūgū-jō; however, today he is regarded as the god of tatami mats, and is now also worshiped by people involved in interior decoration. Wakasahime Shrine is said to have a spiritual power for easy delivery and childcare. Currently, most of the festivals are held at the lower shrine, Wakasahime Shrine, and the priesthood is also resident only at the lower shrine.

History
The origins of Wakasahiko Jinja are unknown. According to the shrine's legend, the two kami appeared in the guise of people from Tang at Shiraishi hamlet in Shimonegori village, Onyu County and the Wakasahiko Jinja was built in 714. It was related to its present location in 715. The lower shrine, Wakasahime Jinja was built in 721. The shrine first appears in historical documentation in the Nihon Sandai Jitsuroku in an entry dated 859, when the upper shrine was promoted to senior second rank, and the lower shrine to junior third rank. In the Engishiki records of 927, the shrine is listed as a Myōjin Taisha. By the Kamakura period, the Wakasahiko Jinja was named the ichinomiya and the Wakasahime Jinja as the ninomiya of the province. Originally the upper shrine was the center of rituals, but this shifted to the lower shrine in the Muromachi period. During the Meiji period era of State Shinto, the shrine was rated as a  under the Modern system of ranked Shinto Shrines

Precincts

Wakasahiko Jinja（Upper shrine） 
 Honden - Fukui Prefectural Tangible Cultural Property
 Rōmon（Zuishin-mon） - Fukui Prefectural Tangible Cultural Property
 Gate - Fukui Prefectural Tangible Cultural Property

Wakasahime Jinja（Lower shrine） 
 Honden - Fukui Prefectural Tangible Cultural Property
 Romon（Zuishin-mon） - Fukui Prefectural Tangible Cultural Property
 Gate - Fukui Prefectural Tangible Cultural Property
 Noh Stage
 Shaso - Fukui Prefectural Tangible Cultural Property

The Wakasahiko Jinja is located a 30-minute walk and the Wakasahime Jinja a ten-minute walk from Higashi-Obama Station on the JR West Obama Line.

See also
List of Shinto shrines
Ichinomiya

References
 Plutschow, Herbe. Matsuri: The Festivals of Japan. RoutledgeCurzon (1996) 
 Ponsonby-Fane, Richard Arthur Brabazon. (1959).  The Imperial House of Japan. Kyoto: Ponsonby Memorial Society. OCLC 194887

External links

Fukui Jinja Honcho
Fukui Tourist Association site

Notes

Beppyo shrines
Shinto shrines in Fukui Prefecture
Wakasa Province
Obama, Fukui
Ichinomiya